Leptolalax bourreti (Bourret's Asian toad or Bourret litter frog) is a frog species in the family Megophryidae. It is known with certainty only from the vicinity of its type locality in Sa Pa in northern Vietnam. Earlier records from Laos refer to Leptolalax eos (described in 2011) and those from Thailand probably to an unnamed species. Its natural habitats are subtropical moist lowland forests, moist montane forests, and rivers. Its status is insufficiently known.

Description
Leptolalax bourreti is a large-sized Leptolalax: males measure  and females  in snout-vent length. Their back is reddish, greenish, or brown with dark spots, with moderate dark spots on the sides. The colouration of irises is variable, clearer above, and coppery, green, or brownish.

References

bourreti
Amphibians of Vietnam
Endemic fauna of Vietnam
Amphibians described in 1983
Taxonomy articles created by Polbot
Taxobox binomials not recognized by IUCN